Tom Stoltman (born 30 May 1994) is a British professional strongman competitor, reigning two time World's Strongest Man and Britain's Strongest Man from Invergordon, Scotland. Nicknamed "The Albatross" due to his sizeable arm span, Stoltman is known for his prowess with the Atlas Stones, the premier strongman event.

On 20 June 2021, Stoltman won the 2021 World's Strongest Man competition, becoming the first man from Scotland to win the World's Strongest Man and the fifth British person to do so. On 29 May 2022, Stoltman won the 2022 World's Strongest Man, becoming only the second Briton to win two titles, 37 years after Geoff Capes and the first to win back to back titles; he is also the 2021 and 2022 Britain's Strongest Man. 

Tom Stoltman is the younger brother of the 2021 Europe's Strongest Man and five-time Scotland's Strongest Man, Luke Stoltman, with whom he runs their YouTube channel The Stoltman Brothers.

Early life 
Tom Stoltman was born in Invergordon, Ross and Cromarty to parents Ben and Sheila, ten years after his older brother and fellow strongman competitor Luke. He was diagnosed with autism at the age of 5. Tom attended Newmore Primary School and Invergordon Academy in the Scottish Highlands where he developed his passion for playing football. As a result of his performances in the school football team, Stoltman was invited to Ross County and Rangers youth set up for trials. Inspired by Luke's success as Scotland's Strongest Man, Stoltman switched his attention to weight training in the local gym at the age of 16. Within a year, he was showing such potential that Luke decided to take him under his wing and guide him through training for strongman.

Strongman career
Aged 18, Stoltman entered and won his first competition, Highlands Strongest Man. This was followed by success at the Scotland's Strongest Man (SSM) qualifier where he subsequently placed 5th in the main event. In 2015 Stoltman reached the podium of SSM, finishing second only to his elder brother Luke the next three years in a row. 2017 was seen as Stoltman's breakout year, he finished second in the UK's Strongest Man competition behind reigning Europe's Strongest Man, Laurence Shahlaei and placed 6th at Britain's Strongest Man (BSM). These performances gained him an invitation to his first World's Strongest Man, but he withdrew from the competition after the first two events in the heats. This was followed up by taking his first SSM win ahead of Luke in 2018, and an 8th-place finish at the World's Ultimate Strongman(WUS) in Dubai the same year.

Stoltman ranked 5th at the 2019 WSM and 3rd at WUS, as well as an SSM trophy and a podium finish at BSM. In 2020 Stoltman returned to the World's Strongest Man finals in Florida, finishing in second place after a low scoring finish in the Hercules Hold. At BSM in the same year, Stoltman took 2nd place and broke the world record for the Giants Live's light set of  Castle Stones in 16.01 seconds.

In 2021, Stoltman won the 2021 World's Strongest Man title in Sacramento, California. Stoltman won two of the first five events, placing him in first ahead of four-time winner Brian Shaw going into the final event. The win was sealed with Stoltman completing the Atlas Stone run in 20.21 seconds, taking the event win and overall title back to Scotland for the first time in the competition's history. Stoltman also won Britain's Strongest Man in 2021, the same year in which his brother Luke won Europe's Strongest Man.

In 2022, Stoltman successfully defended his BSM title at the Utilita Arena in Sheffield, England. At World's Strongest Man, Stoltman took first in his heat, winning the first 4 events. In the final, Stoltman faced three former winners: four-time winner Shaw, 2019 winner Martins Licis, and 2020 winner Oleksiy Novikov. Stoltman won by a margin of 10.5 points, becoming only the second Briton to win two titles, 37 years after Geoff Capes and the first ever to win back to back titles.

Personal life
Stoltman is one of five siblings, all of whom live in and around their hometown of Invergordon close to their father, Ben. Stoltman's youngest brother Harry works for the Stoltman Brothers' business and is currently training to compete in strongman competition. Stoltman married wife Sinead in 2015 and is a supporter of Rangers FC. 

Stoltman's mother Sheila died aged 56 in 2016. Stoltman and his brother Luke regularly cite their mother's influence as key to inspiring them to succeed in their careers. 

In 2021 a permanent tribute to Stoltman and brother Luke was installed by Invergordon Community Council in their hometown, where the signs at the entrances to Invergordon were updated to include their names and achievements.  The sign reads "Welcome to Invergordon. Hometown of the Stoltman Brothers. World, European and UK Strongest Men".

Stoltman was diagnosed with autism at the age of five.

Other ventures

Gym 
In 2018, alongside brother Luke, Stoltman opened a commercial gym, The Stoltman Strength Centre, in Invergordon. This was originally a joint venture with another party though is now fully owned by the Stoltman Brothers Ltd. The brothers use the facility for the majority of their training, having originally trained in Luke’s home gym in his garage.

Health and fitness brand 
As the popularity of the brothers has risen through their achievements and media presence, they began to sell Stoltman Brothers branded merchandise via an online shop. Original offerings were primarily focused around images of the brothers; however this has now been built up to include more everyday lifestyle clothing with Stoltman branding, 'motivational' apparel featuring some of the company/brothers' values and quotes, and more recently a collaboration with other strongmen where t-shirts with the athletes images are produced. All clothing is sold via the Stoltman Brothers website, with preparations also currently underway to open a shop in Invergordon.

Media 
Together with brother Luke, Stoltman has a YouTube channel through which they show training and competition footage, partake in various challenges, and provide an insight to everyday life for professional strongmen athletes. The brothers regularly collaborate on the channel with other well-known health and fitness personalities and YouTubers, with Eddie Hall, Matt Does Fitness, Hafþór Júlíus Björnsson and Larry Wheels all having featured.

The brothers are also the subject of a documentary which is currently in production. Footage for which has been shot by Mulligan Brothers Studio and documents the brothers rise to prominence as elite level strongmen athletes and inspirational figures.

Publications and other media 
Luke and Tom both feature and narrate in Coach Mike Chadwick's The Red On Revolution book, published in 2022.

Personal records
Done in the gym:
 Deadlift –  × 2
 Log Press – 
 Squat – 
 Axle Deadlift – 
 Atlas Stone/Manhood Stone/Castle Stone –  (World's Ultimate Strongman) (Feats of Strength series, 2020) (WR)

Done in Powerlifting:
 Squat – 
 Bench Press – 
 Deadlift – 
 Total – 

Done in Strongman:
 Deadlift – 
 Squat – 391 kg (862 lb)
 18-Inch Deadlift – 
 Axle Press – 
 Keg Toss –  (2021 World's Strongest Man)
 Flinstone Barbell –  (2022 World's Strongest Man)

References

External links
 Official website - www.stoltmanbrothers.com
 WSM 2021 - An interview with the World's strongest brothers
 Back-Muscles.com - Top Secrets of the Tom Stoltman Strongman

Living people
Scottish strength athletes
British strength athletes
Scottish sportsmen
People from Ross and Cromarty
1994 births
Sportspeople with autism